TheBus is the public bus transportation service on the island of Oʻahu, Hawaii, in the United States. TheBus is privately managed by the nonprofit Oahu Transit Services Inc., which operates the system under a public-private partnership with the City and County of Honolulu Department of Transportation Services.

History

Origins: Honolulu Rapid Transit 

TheBus' origin was The Honolulu Rapid Transit and Land Company, which operated buses and trolley lines mostly in the Honolulu district, while most outlying areas were serviced by competing bus companies. Honolulu Rapid Transit (HRT) was founded on June 6, 1898, the same day that Hawaii was annexed by the United States. HRT started streetcar operations in Honolulu in 1901. HRT operated streetcars from 1901–41, motor buses continually from 1925 onward, and trolley buses from 1937–57.

Various issues caused its failure, including a series of strikes by union workers and reports of a hostile takeover of the company by Harry Weinberg in 1955, after he began buying up other properties in Hawaii. Weinberg acquired HRT from the Castle family in 1959.

Public acquisition 
By the 1960s, HRT was associated with prolonged labor strikes that at times left passengers without bus service for more than 60 days, including a 67-day strike in 1967 and a 60-day strike in 1971. The City & County of Honolulu considered acquiring HRT and its competitors, keeping with the trend as more cities in the United States were taking over operations of privately owned bus companies; the United States Department of Transportation informed Honolulu in August 1970 that it would subsidize  of the cost to acquire three private lines: HRT, Leeward Bus, and Wahiawa Transport. On September 14, 1970, and under the guidance of then-Mayor of Honolulu Frank Fasi, the city established Mass Transit Lines (MTL) Limited to oversee operations. After careful negotiations the city agreed to purchase HRT (and its competitors serving the other portions of O'ahu) for a $2 million down payment and an additional $1 million to buy new buses.

Fasi later went to Dallas, Texas and bought 50 ex-Dallas Transit System air-conditioned GM New Look buses (model TDH5303, built in 1964), followed by adding 17 new New Looks (T6H5307A) from GM's Pontiac, Michigan plant. The 50 ex-Dallas buses were renumbered 550-599 and retained their original Dallas livery. Since the original Dallas colors were similar to the old HRT colors, the ex-Dallas buses didn't look totally out of place; however, they were eventually repainted to match the new paint scheme. The ex-Dallas buses were all retired by 1987, but some were purchased by and served for private lines until 1993.

On February 25, 1971, the city council officially approved a contract for MTL to take over operations.  Several days later, on March 1, HRT was renamed TheBus. In addition to changing the paint scheme, MTL made the system friendlier by also relaxing the standard uniform, introducing the current short-sleeve shirts featuring TheBus logo, buses, and slogans. Fasi introduced the "new-identity apparel" in 1974, hoping to change the bus system's stodgy, old image to a fresher, more fun one that would help lure more drivers out of their cars. These uniforms, which are updated every 2–3 years, have become collectors' items.

MTL was dissolved in 1992 after the city switched bus system administration to Oahu Transit Services. The success of TheBus and its business model has been well received by residents, tourists and the transit industry. Ridership for TheBus has grown from 30 million passengers per year to approximately 71 million. TheBus is now the 20th most utilized transit system in the country, the 13th most utilized bus fleet, and the sixth highest transit ridership in the country per-capita. TheBus also has the lowest cost per passenger mile of any system and one of the lowest cost per boarding passengers in the industry.

Strikes and ridership 
Despite its success, TheBus also had its share of setbacks. In August 2003, a strike by union workers left Honolulu without bus service for nearly a month. This move and its settlement the following September coincided with the City Council approving a fare increase to $2 and other increases in rates and pass fees, in part to fund the city's promise to the Teamsters not to cut service and employees. By 2006, ridership and profits rebounded thanks to the implementation of programs geared toward college students who commute to school and work, and rising gas prices.

In 2009, ridership for TheBus dipped slightly by 2 percent due to its July 2009 decision to increase its fares to $2.25 (it was raised to $2.50 starting in July 2010), lower gas prices, and a rising unemployment rate. Overall, Honolulu has had relatively high bus ridership. In 2008, 5.6 percent of Hawaii commuters used public transportation, while 66.8 percent drove to work alone, according to U.S. Census Bureau figures.

On September 29, 2009, Oahu Transit Services and the City & County of Honolulu announced plans to build an intermodal transit center that will be located at TheBus' facilities at Middle Street. The $8.2 million project, called The Middle Street Intermodal Center, whose location will take up a large portion of the Middle Street-Kamehameha Highway intersection, was scheduled to open in October 2010, but was delayed until November 14, 2011, when the terminal opened. The newly expanded facility incorporates TheBus, HandiVan, bicycles, cars, walking and the future light rail line, that, once completed, will include a bridge and walkway for passengers who want to make connections to the rail line's Middle Street station from the transit center. In addition, the center will also have a 1000-car parking facility, an enclosed transit layover bay for waiting passengers, an electronic information billboard, a customer service center, two restroom buildings, a utility building, and security office.

Safety and service improvements 
In May 2010, TheBus began making more changes in order to improve service system-wide. One of the major changes included the installing of security cameras in its fleet in an effort to deter criminal activity, which includes assaults and graffiti. It also installed a GPS system that will allow passengers who are waiting for a certain route to arrive at the stop to track its whereabouts via cellular phone devices and to cut down on complaints from riders on how late the buses arrive.

Fares 
Fares can be paid using a HOLO smart card or cash. A one-way adult trip costs $3, with a daily fare cap of $7.50. A one-way youth fare is $1.50, with one-way disability, senior, and Medicare fares set at $1.25. Prior to July 1, 2021, paper passes were also accepted.

Advertising 

Prior to the City & County taking over the HRT in 1971, outdoor advertising was allowed on the exterior of the buses. However, since the transfer of ownership the advertising has been restricted to the interior of the fleet, even though there was never a restriction or ban on placing ads on the exterior of the buses, a move that the Outdoor Circle (a group that is opposed to outdoor advertising in Hawaii) actively supports. On December 4, 2013, Mayor Kirk Caldwell announced a plan to place ads on the outside of the buses again in an effort to generate money to help fund more revenue, restore routes that were cut, prevent fare increases, and improve the system's infrastructure. If the deal is approved by the City Council, outdoor advertising on TheBus would be restored, but only restricted to the buses because they are moving vehicles; since state law bans non-moving outdoor advertising, they will not be placed at bus stop locations, transfer stations, benches, or shelters. However, the associated bill was deferred, and alternative funding for TheBus was passed by City Council. The Bill failed to pass the required three readings within two years of introduction, and was filed.

Fleet 
As of 2013, 15.4% of the fleet were hybrid models. As of February 2022, 17 of the buses in the fleet were electric vehicles. All buses in TheBus fleet have Hawaii State license plate numbers matching the assigned bus fleet number and beginning with the letters "BUS", and are equipped with automatic stop annunciators. The voice played on the annunciators is provided by songwriter and Hawaiian language scholar Puakea Nogelmeier.

TheHandi-Van 
TheHandi-Van is the paratransit supplement to TheBus, and provides shared-ride services to disabled passengers unable to use TheBus. Registration is required, and each ride must be reserved in advance. The fleet includes 207 vehicles.

Reception 
Due to its low cost and wide coverage, TheBus is a very popular means of travel by high school students. The fact that free school bus routes are not provided for the majority of Honolulu's students, as they are in many other parts in the United States, also contributes to high usage of TheBus among high school students.  Because of this popularity, and the fact it was developed during Fasi's tenure as mayor of Honolulu, it received the nickname "Uncle Fasi's Limousine Service," which is usually shortened to "Uncle Fasi's" or "Fasi's Limo."

"America's Best Transit System" 
Since its inception, TheBus has been recognized twice by the American Public Transportation Association as America's Best Transit System for 1994–1995 and 2000–2001.

See also 
 Chance RT-52
 List of TheBus routes
 Wiki Wiki Shuttle

References

External links 

 City & County of Honolulu Department of Transportation Services
 TheBus 
 TheBus Routes and Timetables
 TheHandi-Van

 
Bus transportation in Hawaii
Transportation in Honolulu County, Hawaii
Organizations established in 1971
Transit agencies in Hawaii
1971 establishments in Hawaii